Geraldine Bedell is a British novelist and writer for The Observer.

She drew wide public attention when she claimed she had been disinvited from a planned appearance at the first International Festival of Literature in Dubai, because her novel The Gulf Between Us featured a homosexual sheikh. Writer Margaret Atwood cancelled her scheduled appearance but later retracted when she found out that Bedell had never been invited to the Festival nor had her book been banned. Atwood subsequently made two virtual appearances at the Festival and appeared in person at the 2011 Festival.

Family
She is married to Charles Leadbeater and is the sister of Elaine Bedell, CEO of the Southbank Centre.

Bedell's first marriage was to banker Jon Norton, with whom she has two children. After their divorce, Norton married the Labour Party politician and minister Mo Mowlam in 1995. Mowlam died in 2005.

Books
 The Handmade House (Penguin, 2005)
  The Gulf Between Us (Penguin, 2009)
 Party Tricks (Hodder & Stoughton, 1996)
 A Fabulous Fling (HarperCollins, 2000)

References

21st-century English novelists
English women novelists
English romantic fiction writers
Living people
Year of birth missing (living people)
Place of birth missing (living people)
Women romantic fiction writers
21st-century English women writers